Pseudolarix is a genus of coniferous trees in the pine family Pinaceae containing three species, the extant Pseudolarix amabilis and the extinct species Pseudolarix japonica and Pseudolarix wehrii. Pseudolarix species are commonly known as golden larch, but are not true larches (Larix) being more closely related to Keteleeria, Abies and Cedrus. P. wehrii is described from fossils dating to the Early Eocene (Ypresian), of Western North America where it is found in the Eocene Okanagan Highlands Allenby and Klondike Mountain Formations. The youngest known occurrence is of mummified fossils found in the Late Eocene Buchanan Lake Formation on Axel Heiberg Island. P. japonica is known from Middle Miocene to Pliocene sediments in Japan and Miocene deposits of Korea. Fossils assigned to Pseudolarix as a genus date possibly as old as the Early Cretaceous Hauterivian stage in Mongolia.

Growth
The shoots are dimorphic, with long shoots and short shoots similar to a larch, though the short shoots are not so markedly short, lengthening about 5 mm annually. The leaves are bright green, 3–6 cm long and 2–3 mm broad, with two glaucous stomatal bands on the underside; they turn a brilliant golden yellow before falling in the autumn, hence the common name. The leaves are arranged spirally, widely spaced on long shoots, and in a dense whorl on the short shoots.

The cones are distinctive, superficially resembling a small globe artichoke, 4–7 cm long and 4–6 cm broad, with pointed triangular scales; they mature about 7 months after pollination, when (like fir and cedar cones) they disintegrate to release the winged seeds. The male cones, as in Keteleeria, are produced in umbels of several together in one bud.

Gallery

References

External links

Pseudolarix in the Flora of China

Pinaceae
Endemic flora of China
Trees of China
Medicinal plants of Asia
Plants used in traditional Chinese medicine
Extant Eocene first appearances
Endangered flora of Asia
Deciduous conifers
Conifer genera